Schram may refer to:

Placenames
Schram City, Illinois, USA

Surnames
Albert Schram (born 1964), Dutch-born academic
Albin Schram (1926–2005), Czechoslovakian letter collector
Bitty Schram (born 1968), American actress
Constance Wiel Schram (1890–1955), Norwegian writer and translator
Dávid Schram (born 1976), Hungarian musician and record producer
Dominic Schram (1722–1797), German Benedictine theologian and canonist
Frederick Schram (born 1943), American palaeontologist and carcinologist
Jacob Schram (1826–1905), founder and original owner of Schramsberg Vineyards, a winery in Napa Valley, California
Jacob Schram (1870–1952) (1870–1952), Norwegian businessman
Jessy Schram (born 1986), American actress
Ken Schram (1947–2014), American broadcaster
Magnús Orri Schram (born 1972), Icelandic politician
Stuart R. Schram (1924–2012), American physicist, political scientist and sinologist
Tessa Schram (born 1988), Dutch actress and director
Thomas Schram (1882–1950), Norwegian physician
Volckert Schram ( 1620–1673), 17th-century Dutch admiral
Frederik Schram (born 1995), Danish-born Icelandic footballer

See also
Schramm (disambiguation)